Roan is a Frisian given name. It is sometimes used also in other languages such as English, where it can be also an alternate form of Rowan. It can be also a surname. Variants of the name include Ronne. It comes from Proto-Germanic *hrabanaz (Old High German hraban) meaning "raven".

Given name 
Roan Carneiro (born 1978), Brazilian mixed martial artist

Surname 
Chappell Roan, American sinre-songwriter
Charles H. Roan (1923–1944), United States Marine who sacrificed his life during World War II, posthumously awarded the Medal of Honor
Dan Roan (born 1976), British broadcast journalist, and current BBC News Sports Correspondent

Fictional
Roan Fel, a fictional character in the Star Wars expanded universe
Roan Lands, a character from Star Wars
Roan, a character from Grandia II
Roan, fictional character in show “The 100”

References 

Frisian masculine given names